Dale Fleming (born 20 August 1971) is a former Australian rules footballer who played with Fitzroy in the Australian Football League (AFL).

Fleming started his AFL career at Hawthorn, but was traded to Fitzroy without making an appearance in the seniors. He played 11 games for Fitzroy in the 1992 AFL season and had a five-goal haul in a win over the Sydney Swans at the SCG. In 1993 he appeared in only two rounds and left the club at the end of the year. Fleming moved to South Australia in 1994, where he played for Norwood until 2001. He was a member of Norwood's 1997 premiership team.

References

1971 births
Australian rules footballers from Victoria (Australia)
Fitzroy Football Club players
Norwood Football Club players
Living people
People educated at Marcellin College, Bulleen